Serina is a comune (municipality) in the Province of Bergamo in the Italian region of Lombardy, located about  northeast of Milan and about  northeast of Bergamo.

The municipality of Serina contains the frazioni (subdivisions, mainly villages and hamlets) Corone, Lepreno, Bagnella, and Valpiana.

Serina borders the following municipalities: Algua, Cornalba, Costa di Serina, Dossena, Oltre il Colle, Roncobello, San Pellegrino Terme.

Demographic evolution

Notable people 
 Palma Vecchio (ca.1480 – 1528), a Venetian painter of the Italian High Renaissance.

References

External links
 www.serina-bg.it/